Han Thao railway station is a railway station located in Han Thao Subdistrict, Pak Phayun District, Phatthalung. Han Thao Station is one of the stations where the main station building is on the passing loop.

Train services 
 Rapid No. 169/170 Bangkok-Yala-Bangkok
 Local No. 445/446 Chumphon-Hat Yai Junction-Chumphon
 Local No. 447/448 Surat Thani-Sungai Kolok-Surat Thani
 Local No. 451/452 Nakhon Si Thammarat-Sungai Kolok-Nakhon Si Thammarat
 Local No. 455/456 Nakhon Si Thammarat-Yala-Nakhon Si Thammarat
 Local No. 463/464 Phatthalung-Sungai Kolok-Phatthalung

References 
 
 

Railway stations in Thailand